Zakaria Isa Suraka (born 17 January 1996) is a Ghanaian professional footballer who plays as a forward for FK Rudar Pljevlja.

Club career
Suraka arrived to Serbia from Vision F.C. in the spring of 2014. He joined Sloga Petrovac na Mlavi, and he made just 3 appearances for that club, but he scored 1 goal at the only match he started on the pitch. That was the last fixture of 2013–14 season, against Radnik Surdulica. People from FK Inđija recognized Suraka's football potential and take him in their club in summer 2014. There were some speculations about his transfer to Netherlands in the winter break off-season, but he stayed with club until the end of season.

For the 2014–15 season he made 19 Serbian First League appearances and scored 3 goals, against Moravac Mrštane in 2nd, Bežanija in 5th, Mačva Šabac in the 25th fixture. He also played 2 cup matches, against Javor Ivanjica, when he scored 2 goals, and Radnički Niš. Zakaria signed one-year contract with Radnik Surdulica in summer 2015. He made his SuperLiga in the 6th fixture of 2015–16, against Red Star Belgrade, when he was substituted in for Lazar Arsić in second half of the match.

In summer 2016, Suraka moved to Dinamo Vranje. He stayed at Dinamo for three years, becoming the club's best player. After Dinamo Vranje, he joined Mladost Lučani in summer 2019.

Career statistics

Club

References

External links
Zakaria Suraka stats at utakmica.rs 

1996 births
Living people
Footballers from Accra
Ghanaian footballers
Ghanaian expatriate footballers
FK Sloga Petrovac na Mlavi players
FK Inđija players
FK Radnik Surdulica players
FK Dinamo Vranje players
FK Mladost Lučani players
FK Železničar Pančevo players
FK Rudar Pljevlja players
Serbian First League players
Serbian SuperLiga players
Association football forwards
Ghanaian expatriate sportspeople in Serbia
Expatriate footballers in Serbia
Expatriate footballers in Montenegro
Vision F.C. players